Alen Grgić (born 10 August 1994) is a Croatian football defender who plays for Rijeka.

Career statistics

References

External links
 

1994 births
Living people
People from Nova Gradiška
Croatian footballers
Association football fullbacks
NK Osijek players
NK Sesvete players
Diósgyőri VTK players
NK Slaven Belupo players
HNK Rijeka players
Croatian Football League players
First Football League (Croatia) players
Nemzeti Bajnokság I players
Croatian expatriate footballers
Expatriate footballers in Hungary
Croatian expatriate sportspeople in Hungary